When in Rome Do as The Vandals is the first album by the Huntington Beach punk rock band The Vandals, released in 1984 by National Trust Records, Its title is a play on the phrase "When in Rome, do as the Romans do", as the Vandals was also the name of a Germanic tribe which had invaded the Roman Empire and helped lead to its destruction. The album's cover played on this theme by showing the Los Angeles Memorial Coliseum in a state of destruction. It was the band's last recording with vocalist Stevo, who left the band shortly after due to personality conflicts with some of the other members.

On the original LP release Brent Turner is credited as having performed all of the bass tracks, but by the time of its release Chalmer Lumary had joined the band on the bass position. Chalmer's name and photo are therefore included on the album sleeve along with those of the other members. The album sleeve also lists the seventh track as being "It's Not Unusual," a cover of a song by Burt Bacharach. The label on the LP itself, however, correctly lists this track as being a cover of "Hocus Pocus" by the band Focus. The sleeve also lists the album's sixth track as being spelled "Viking Suite," although the label again corrects this error by spelling it "Viking Suit" (as it is pronounced in the song's lyrics).

The album was re-released in 1989 in CD format along with the band's debut EP Peace thru Vandalism as Peace Thru Vandalism / When in Rome Do as The Vandals. The CD version was released by Restless Records (later reissued by Time Bomb Recordings) and correctly lists the song titles as described above.

Track listing
All songs written by The Vandals except where indicated

Personnel
Steven Ronald "Stevo" Jensen - vocals, scratch box on "Ladykiller"
Jan Nils Ackermann - guitar, acoustic guitars on "Mohawk Town" and "Rico"
Brent Turner - bass
Joe Escalante - Drums, trumpet on "Rico"
Chalmer Lumary - backing vocals

Album information
Record label:
original LP release: National Trust Records
CD re-release: Restless Records (1989),  Time Bomb Recordings (1995)
Produced by Thom Wilson
Art & design by Mike Doud
Cover photos by Alan Newberg
Sleeve photos by Mike Leczkowski

1984 debut albums
National Trust Records albums
Time Bomb Recordings albums
The Vandals albums
Albums produced by Thom Wilson